Berberis papillosa is a species of plant in the family Berberidaceae. It is endemic to Ecuador.  Its natural habitats are subtropical or tropical high-altitude shrubland and subtropical or tropical high-altitude grassland.

References

Endemic flora of Ecuador
papillosa
Data deficient plants
Taxonomy articles created by Polbot